Muizz-ud-Din Muhammad Shah II, born Karim Khan, was a ruler of the Muzaffarid dynasty, who reigned over the Gujarat Sultanate from 1442 to 1451. He expanded and strengthened the Sultanate.

Reign

Ahmad Shah I was succeeded by his generous pleasure-loving son Muhammad Sháh, Ghiás-ud-dunya Wad-dín, also styled Zarbaksh the Gold Giver.

In 1445, Muhammad marched against Bír Rái of Idar State, but on that chief agreeing to pay tribute he confirmed him in the possession of his state. His next expedition was against Kánha Rái of Dungarpur, who took refuge in the hills, but afterwards returned, and paying tribute, was given charge of his country. Muhammad married Bíbi Mughli, daughter of Jám Júna of Samma dynasty ruling from Thatta in Sindh. She bore a son, Fateh Khán, who was afterwards became well known as Sultán Mahmud Begada. In 1450, Muhammad marched upon Champaner, and took the lower fortress. Gangádás of Chámpáner had a strong ally in Sultán Mahmúd Khilji, the ruler of Malwa Sultanate, and on his approach Muhammad Sháh retired to Godhra, and Mahmúd Khilji continued his march upon Gujarát at the head of 80,000 horse. Muhammad Sháh was preparing to fly to Diu, when the nobles, disgusted at his cowardice, caused him to be poisoned. Other sources say, on the return journey, he fell seriously ill and died in February, 1451. Muhammad Sháh’s after-death title is Khûdáigán-i-Karím, the Gracious Lord. He was buried left to his father Ahmad Shah's Tomb in Manek Chowk, Ahmedabad.

References

Gujarat sultans
1451 deaths
15th-century Indian monarchs